Profound Lake or Lake Profound is a lake  northwest of Jasper Point in northeast Fildes Peninsula, King George Island. The feature was named "Ozero Glubokoye" (deep lake) by the Soviet Antarctic Expedition working from Bellingshausen Station from 1968, but both forms of the name are already in use in the Antarctic.  The United Kingdom Antarctic Place-Names Committee (UK-APC) amended the name in 1979 to avoid duplication.

Also known as Lago Uruguay or Uruguay Lake, it is the lake closest to the Uruguayan scientific station Artigas Base and is therefore used as a water source for the station.

References

Profound
Bodies of water of King George Island (South Shetland Islands)
Profound